The 1912 Massachusetts gubernatorial election took place on November 5, 1912. Democratic Governor Eugene Foss defeated the Republican candidate Joseph H. Walker and Progressive candidate Charles S. Bird.

Democratic primary

Candidates
Eugene Foss, incumbent Governor.
Joseph C. Pelletier, District Attorney of Suffolk County

Results

Republican primary

Candidates
Joseph H. Walker, former Speaker of the Massachusetts House of Representatives.
Everett Chamberlin Benton, businessman and former member of the Massachusetts Governor's Council.

Results

General election

Candidates
Charles Sumner Bird, paper manufacturer (Progressive)
Alfred H. Evans (Prohibition)
Eugene Foss, incumbent Governor (Democratic)
Arthur Elmer Reimer, 1912 nominee for President of the United States (Socialist Labor)
Roland D. Sawyer, Congregationalist pastor (Socialist)
Joseph H. Walker, former Speaker of the Massachusetts House of Representatives (Republican)

Results

See also
 1912 Massachusetts legislature

References

1912 Massachusetts elections
1912
Massachusetts